Cerro El Toro is a mountain in the Andes located on the border between Argentina and Chile. It has an elevation of 6,168 m above sea level. Its territory is within the Argentinean protection areas of Provincial Reserve San Guillermo. The Argentinean side is at San Juan province, commune of Iglesia. Chilean side is at the Huasco province, and commune of Alto del Carmen.

First Ascents 
Toro was first climbed by Incas in unknown dates. A mummy was found on the Argentine slopes in 1964. The first recorded post colonization ascent was by Antonio Beorchia Nigris (Italy), Jorge Enrique Varas and Sergio Fernandez (Argentina) in 02/26/1964.

Elevation 
It has an official height of 6160 meters. Other data from available digital elevation models: SRTM yields 6148 metres, ASTER 6122 metres and TanDEM-X 6184 metres. The height of the nearest key col is 4326 meters, leading to a topographic prominence of 1842 meters. Toro is considered a Mountain Range according to the Dominance System  and its dominance is 29.86%. Its parent peak is Majadita and the Topographic isolation is 143.4 kilometers.

See also

 List of mountains in the Andes
 List of Ultras of South America

External links
 Elevation information about Toro
 Weather Forecast at Toro
 "Cerro del Toro, Argentina/Chile" on Peakbagger

References

El Toro, Cerro
Mountains of Chile
Argentina–Chile border
Six-thousanders of the Andes
Mountains of Atacama Region
Mountains of San Juan Province, Argentina